Anderson County is a county located in the U.S. state of South Carolina. As of the 2020 census, its population was 203,718. Its county seat is Anderson. Named for Revolutionary War leader Robert Anderson, the county is located in northwestern South Carolina, along the state line of Georgia. Anderson County is included in the Greenville-Anderson-Mauldin, SC Metropolitan Statistical Area. The area is a growing industrial, commercial and tourist center. It is the home of Anderson University, a private, selective comprehensive university of approximately 3,000 undergraduate and graduate students

History 
Anderson County was founded in 1826 after the dissolution of the Pendleton District and was named after Robert Anderson, an American Revolutionary War general. During the Civil War, the county became a center of ammunitions production for the Confederate States Army. The county seat and largest city is Anderson; both the county and city are also located in the Greenville-Anderson-Mauldin, SC Metropolitan Statistical Area. Agriculturally, the county is ranked high in production. Its ranked first in the southeast, second in the south, and twenty-third in the United States according to the United States Department of Commerce. Cotton, corn, and various fruits and vegetables are grown along with a large poultry industry located the county.

Geography

Anderson County is in the Savannah River basin and the Saluda River basin.

State and local protected areas 
 Broyles Recreation Area
 Sadlers Creek State Park

Major water bodies 
 Chattooga River
 Lake Hartwell
 Saluda River
 Savannah River
 Lake Secession

Adjacent counties
 Pickens County – north
 Greenville County – northeast
 Laurens County – east
 Abbeville County – south
 Elbert County, Georgia – southwest
 Hart County, Georgia – west
 Oconee County – northwest

Major highways

Major infrastructure 
 Anderson Regional Airport

Demographics

2020 census

* Note: the US Census treats Hispanic/Latino as an ethnic category. This table excludes Latinos from the racial categories and assigns them to a separate category. Hispanics/Latinos can be of any race.

As of the 2020 United States census, there were 203,718 people, 75,825 households, and 52,038 families residing in the county.

2010 census
As of the 2010 United States Census, there were 187,126 people, 73,829 households, and 51,922 families residing in the county. The racial makeup of the county was 80.1% white, 16.0% black or African American, 0.8% Asian, 0.3% American Indian, 1.3% from other races, and 1.5% from two or more races. Those of Hispanic or Latino origin made up 2.9% of the population. In terms of ancestry, 15.9% were American, 13.6% were Irish, 10.8% were English, and 10.2% were German.

Of the 73,829 households, 33.3% had children under the age of 18 living with them, 51.1% were married couples living together, 14.5% had a female householder with no husband present, 29.7% were non-families, and 25.4% of all households were made up of individuals. The average household size was 2.50 and the average family size was 2.98. The median age was 39.7 years.

The median income for a household in the county was $42,871 and the median income for a family was $53,229. Males had a median income of $41,885 versus $30,920 for females. The per capita income for the county was $22,117. About 12.4% of families and 15.8% of the population were below the poverty line, including 23.0% of those under age 18 and 10.2% of those age 65 or over.

Law and government
Anderson County has a Council-Administrator form of government under South Carolina law. County Council members are elected from seven single-member districts for two-year terms. All seven council seats are open for election every two years.

Anderson County Councilmen are:
 District 1:  John B. Wright Jr. (North Anderson)
 District 2:  Glenn A. Davis (South & East Anderson)
 District 3:  S. Ray Graham (Belton/Starr/Iva area)
 District 4:  Brett Sanders (Pendleton area)
 District 5:  Tommy Dunn (West Anderson)
 District 6:  Jimmy Davis (Powdersville area)
 District 7:  M. Cindy Wilson (Williamston/Honea Path area)

The Anderson County Administrator is Rusty Burns.

Operations
Anderson County has ten divisions:
 Administration
 Parks, Recreation & Tourism
 Central Services
 Economic Development
 Emergency Services
 EMS & Special Operations
 Environmental Services
 Finance
 Planning
 Transportation

Politics
Since the 1970s, Anderson County has been a rock-solid Republican bastion, with the party going on a streak of winning the county in each presidential election since 1984. The exceptions came in 1976 and 1980, when Southerner Jimmy Carter overwhelmingly captured the county in the former election and fairly solidly in the latter.

Economy
Early industry in the county was textile mills, processing southern cotton. In the 21st century, industry has diversified with more than 230 manufacturers, including 22 international companies. The top major industries in Anderson include manufacturers of automotive products, metal products, industrial machinery, plastics, publishing and textiles.  Two industries that many times interconnect are the plastic and automotive sectors.  There are more than 27 BMW suppliers in the upstate, which is recognized internationally as an automotive supplier hub.  The plastic industry has a strong presence in the upstate, with 244 plastic companies located within the 10 counties of the northwest corner of SC.  Anderson County has 11 automotive suppliers and is a major player in the plastic industry, with 27 plastic companies located within its borders.

Communities

Cities
 Anderson (county seat and largest city)
 Belton
 Clemson (mostly in Pickens County)
 Easley (mostly in Pickens County)

Towns
 Honea Path (partly in Abbeville County)
 Iva
 Pelzer
 Pendleton
 Starr
 West Pelzer
 Williamston

Census-designated places
 Centerville
 Fair Play (mostly in Oconee County)
 Homeland Park
 Northlake
 Piedmont (partly in Greenville County)
 Powdersville

Unincorporated communities
 Craytonville
 La France
 Sandy Springs
 Townville (partly in Oconee County)
 Cheddar
 Piercetown

See also
 List of counties in South Carolina
 National Register of Historic Places listings in Anderson County, South Carolina
 South Carolina State Parks

References

External links

 
 
 Visit Anderson website
 Anderson County Library
 Anderson County history and images

 
1826 establishments in South Carolina
Populated places established in 1826
Counties of Appalachia